Barbara Ann Ryman (born February 3, 1951) is an American singer-songwriter, as well as a spiritual healer.  Her first album, Winds of Good Fortune, was released in 1993, and she has since released six more albums: Lay Me Open (1995), Like A Tree (1998), Falling Down to Heaven (2002), Earthbound (2007), Catch the Sunset (2012) and her most recent, Breathe (2019), respectively.

Musical career
Ryman began playing at Twin Cities coffeehouses  but as her career took off, she nationally toured the folk circuit playing at such venues as Boston's Club Passim, her hometown's The Cedar Cultural Center, Nashville's Bluebird Café, Portland's Folk Music Society, and Texas' Uncle Calvin's.  Her music has since charted nationally on Folk-DJ’s top albums chart as well as on NACC.  Ryman has been featured on The Midnight Special, a syndicated radio show, and The Morning Show. She headlined the first rural LGBT Pride, East-Central Minnesota Pride.  In 2006, the ABC TV show Sons & Daughters licensed Ryman's song, All American Dysfunctional Family.  Ryman had artist and album reviews published in the StarTribune, and on TwinCities.com, as well as national folk and world music media including Dirty Linen and Sing Out!.  According to Sault Ste. Marie's SooToday.com, "Ryman lays insightful, witty lyrics into a rich mosaic of contemporary folk, gentle rock, and country blues, delivering it all with a clear, compelling voice. She gently charms every audience she meets with her sincerity and playful stage banter."

Awards
Ryman was nominated for several music awards by the Minnesota Music Academy, including: Songwriter of the Year and Folk Album of the Year.  She was past winner of the McKnight Composer Fellowship from the McKnight Foundation (2002).  In 2007, Ryman was a NewSong Showcase Winner at the Walnut Valley Festival in the Feeling Good category with her song, Strawberry Pie.  She was a finalist in other competitions, such as at Big Top Chautauqua and at the Great River Folk Fest.

Personal life
Besides being a performing songwriter, Ryman also carries out energy work on individuals and with rivers. Ryman's son is comedian Tommy Ryman.

Discography
 Winds of Good Fortune (1993)
 Lay Me Open (1995)
 Like A Tree (1998)
 Falling Down to Heaven (2002)
 Earthbound (2007)
 Catch the Sunset (2012)
 Breathe (2019)

References

External links
 
 Barb Ryman's River Work Website

1951 births
Living people
21st-century American guitarists
21st-century American singers
21st-century American women guitarists
21st-century American women singers
American feminists
American folk musicians
American women singer-songwriters
Feminist musicians
Indie folk musicians
Artists from Minnesota
Singer-songwriters from Minnesota
American lesbian musicians